Stadionul Municipal is a multi-purpose stadium in Roșiorii de Vede, Romania. It is currently used mostly for football matches, is the home ground of Sporting Roșiori and has a capacity of 5,000 people (2,000 on seats). In the past, the stadium was the home ground of other local teams such as CFR Roșiori, Rova Roșiori or Juventus Roșiori.

References

External links
Stadionul Municipal (Roșiorii de Vede) at soccerway.com
Stadionul Municipal (Roșiorii de Vede) at europlan-online.de

Football venues in Romania
Sport in Teleorman County
Buildings and structures in Teleorman County
Roșiorii de Vede